The Caracău Viaduct is a viaduct in Romania, between the cities of Miercurea Ciuc and Ghimeș. The bridge was opened on October 18, 1897.

In August 1916, during World War I, the main span of the bridge was completely destroyed by the retreating Austro-Hungarian troops, but it was rebuilt in 1917. The viaduct was demolished again in September 1944 by retreating German soldiers during World War II. The whole structure was reconstructed in 1946, with the bridge reopened on September 14, 1946.

See also
List of bridges in Romania

References

External links
 Description (in Romanian)

Bridges completed in 1897
Bridges completed in 1946
Buildings and structures in Harghita County
Concrete bridges
Railway bridges in Romania
Viaducts in Romania